The Montevideo Programme for the Development and Periodic Review of Environmental Law (Montevideo Environmental Law Programme) is a United Nations sequential ten-year intergovernmental program for the development and periodic review of Environmental Law, designed to strengthen the related capacity in countries. The program was conceived in 1982.

The program is based on the three pillars of the Charter of the United Nations which binds peace and security, human rights and development to the rule of law.

UNEP (United Nations Environment Programme) is the Secretariat of the program.

Objectives 
In 2019, the United Nations Environment Assembly adopted the Fifth Montevideo Programme, which runs from January 2020 to December 2029, developed to build on the successes of the past programs. Aim is to enable countries to meet the environmental objectives found in United Nations resolutions, in particular those adopted by the UN Environment Assembly and reflected in multilateral environmental agreements.

The aim of the Montevideo Programme is to:
Support the development of adequate and effective environmental legislation and legal frameworks to address environmental issues; 
Strengthen the implementation of environmental law at national level; 
Support capacity-building for increased effectiveness of environmental law for stakeholders; 
Support national Governments, upon their request, in the development and implementation of environmental rule of law; 
Promote the role of environmental law in the context of effective environmental governance.
In partnership with UN agencies, intergovernmental organizations, civil-society organizations, the private sector, and academics, the program focuses on a number of strategies and activities. These include guidance to develop effective law models, participation and networking among stakeholders and the general public, education and training on environmental law, and research on environmental issues.

The program is to contribute to the environmental dimension of the 2030 Agenda for Sustainable Development.
This agenda seeks to strengthen universal peace and the eradication of poverty in order to support sustainable development.

The effective implementation of the fifth program is dependent on the tailoring of clearly defined and achievable activities to the needs and priorities of the particular countries. Activities, for example to achieve sustainable management and use of natural resources and the protection of the environment are to also promote gender equality and intergenerational equity.

Steering committees composed of two or three regional representatives will represent the activities at national focal points at the global meetings, and will work with the secretariat in the implementation of the Montevideo Programme.

Assistance will be invited from academics, experts in the field of environmental law, relevant civil-society organizations and the private sector, where appropriate.

Previous programs 
Four previous Montevideo Programmes have been implemented:
Montevideo IV Programme (2010-2019)
Montevideo III Programme (2000-2009)
Montevideo II Programme (1990-1999)
Montevideo I Programme (1981–1990)

References

External links 
UNEP Fifth Montevideo Programme

United Nations Environment Programme
Environmental law